Buck Run (known locally as Dickey's Run) is an  tributary of the West Branch Conococheague Creek in Franklin County, Pennsylvania.  Buck Run rises along the eastern base of Tuscarora Mountain, just below Tuscarora Summit, and cuts through Buchanan's Birthplace State Park before meeting the West Branch Conococheague Creek north of Mercersburg.

See also
List of rivers of Pennsylvania

References

Rivers of Pennsylvania
Rivers of Franklin County, Pennsylvania
Tributaries of the Potomac River